Wang Weiyi (987-1067), also known as Wang Weide (王惟德), was a Chinese physician and writer of the Song Dynasty. He was as an expert on acupuncture famous for creating bronze figure models and compiling a book on the subject. He was the imperial physician of two emperors: Renzong and Yingzong.

Career

Wang Weiyi was a chief physician at the Hanlin Academy, held the title of Chaosan Dafu (朝散大夫) and a post in the Department of the Palace (殿中省). From 1026, by an imperial edict, he presided over the works on forging two bronze acupuncture models (针灸铜人) and editing of a book on the subject, the three-volume Tongren Shuxue Zhenjiu Tujing (Illustrated Manual of Acupuncture Points on a Bronze Figure; 铜人腧穴针灸图经).

Acupuncture has been known since at least several centuries prior, and body models were being created earlier too (e.g. lacquer figurines excavated from a Han Dynasty tomb), but the ones created by Wang Weiyi were much more precise and of human size. They are sometimes called Tiansheng Bronze Figures after the era name in which they were constructed. The two man-sized bronze figures were designed with care about the actual human body proportion. They were engraved with 354 acupoints - 4 millimeter deep, marked with names and connected according to the twelve meridians. The limbs were movable and disassemblable. Inside the bronze trunk, there were internal organs and skeleton made of wood. Replacing paper models with this three-dimensional apparatus was a great improvement in teaching and examination: the outside of the bronze statue was first covered with wax to seal the acupoints and water (or mercury) was poured inside the dummy. If the needle was inserted by the examinee into the correct acupoint, water or mercury would ooze out.

Wang also participated in the revision of a Han Dynasty classic medical work, The Yellow Emperor's Canon of Eighty-One Difficult Issues.

In 1030, he overlooked engraving of his treatise on stone tablets placed in a temple in Kaifeng (the capital of the empire, that time known as Bianjing, 汴京).

Wang Weiyi's achievements re-enabled the development and popularization of acupuncture, which has been in decline since the Tang Dynasty physician Wang Xi discouraged its use.

Modern depictions

A 2014 film produced by CCTV6 and directed by Fang Junliang, Master of Needles (天下第一针), depicts Wang Weiyi's life, with actor Zhai Xiaoxing in the main role.

Notes and references

Notes

References

11th-century Chinese physicians
11th-century Chinese writers
Chinese medical writers
Chinese non-fiction writers
Medieval Chinese physicians
Song dynasty science writers